Anna Blinkova and Yanina Wickmayer were the defending champions but chose not to participate.

Anna Bondár and Lara Salden won the title, defeating Arianne Hartono and Olivia Tjandramulia in the final, 6–7(9–11), 6–2, [10–4].

Seeds

Draw

Draw

References
Main Draw

Wiesbaden Tennis Open - Doubles